A lump sum is a single payment of money, as opposed to a series of payments made over time (such as an annuity).

The United States Department of Housing and Urban Development distinguishes between "price analysis" and "cost analysis" by whether the decision maker compares lump sum amounts, or subjects contract prices to an itemized cost breakdown.

In 1911, American union leaders including Samuel Gompers of the American Federation of Labor expressed opposition to lump sums being awarded to their members pursuant to a new workers compensation law, saying that when they received lump sums rather than periodic payments the risk of them squandering the money was greater.

The Financial Times reported in July 2011 that research by Prudential had found that 79% of polled pensioners in the UK collecting a company or private pension that year took a tax-free lump sum as part of their retirement benefits, as compared to 76% in 2008. Prudential was of the view that for many retirees, a lump sum at the time of retirement was the most tax efficient option.  However, Prudential's head of business development, Vince Smith Hughes, said, "some pensioners are beginning to regret the way they used the tax-free cash. The days of buying a shiny new car or going on a once-in-a-lifetime holiday may be gone."

See also
 Lump-sum tax
 Lottery payouts
 Structured settlement
 Distortions (economics)
 Annuity
 Seller's points

References

External links
 SEC guidelines for lump sum payouts
Red Book - Form of Contract, Lump Sum Contracts, Contracts Working Party, IChemE, 2001, 
  The lump sum handbook: investment and tax strategies for a secure retirement, Anthony Gallea, Prentice Hall, 1993, 
Lump-sum distributions from retirement saving plans: receipt and utilization, James M. Poterba, Steven F. Venti, David A. Wise, National Bureau of Economic Research, 1995
Veterans' benefits; veterans have mixed views on a lump sum disability payment option: report to the chairman, Committee on Veterans' Affairs, House of Representatives, DIANE Publishing, 
International claims: Their settlement by lump sum agreements, Lillich, Richard B., Weston, Burns H., University Press of Virginia, 1975, 

Payments

fr:Forfait